Ezinachi is a ward in the southern area of Okigwe in Nigeria, West Africa. The ward comprised four communities, Iheate Ama-Ano, Ihite Ama Ise, Ikega Obinaohia and Ikega Obina-Orie.

References

External links
 

Towns in Imo State